The Roman Catholic Diocese of Jayapura is a diocese located in the city of Jayapura in the Ecclesiastical province of Merauke in Indonesia.

History
 May 12, 1949: Established as the Apostolic Prefecture of Hollandia from the Apostolic Vicariate of Dutch New Guinea
 June 14, 1954: Promoted as the Apostolic Vicariate of Hollandia
 June 28, 1963: Renamed as Apostolic Vicariate of Kota Baru
 June 12, 1964: Renamed as Apostolic Vicariate of Sukarnapura
 November 15, 1966: Promoted as Diocese of Sukarnapura
 April 25, 1969: Renamed as Diocese of Djajapura
 August 22, 1973: Renamed as Diocese of Jayapura

Leadership
 Bishops of Jayapura (Roman rite)
 Yanuarius Teofilus Matopai You (October 29, 2022 - present)
 Bishop Leo Laba Ladjar, O.F.M. (August 29, 1997 – October 29, 2022)
 Bishop Herman Ferdinandus Maria Münninghoff, O.F.M. (August 22, 1973 – August 29, 1997)
 Bishops of Djajapura (Roman Rite)
 Bishop Herman Ferdinandus Maria Münninghoff, O.F.M. (May 6, 1972 – August 22, 1973)
 Bishop Rudolf Joseph Manfred Staverman, O.F.M. (April 25, 1969 – May 6, 1972)
 Bishops of Sukarnapura (Roman Rite)
 Bishop Rudolf Joseph Manfred Staverman, O.F.M. (November 15, 1966 – April 25, 1969)
 Vicars Apostolic of Sukarnapura (Roman Rite)
 Bishop Rudolf Joseph Manfred Staverman, O.F.M. (June 12, 1964 – November 15, 1966)
 Vicars Apostolic of Kota Baru (Roman Rite)
 Bishop Rudolf Joseph Manfred Staverman, O.F.M. (June 28, 1963 – June 12, 1964)
 Vicars Apostolic of Hollandia (Roman Rite)
 Bishop Rudolf Joseph Manfred Staverman, O.F.M. (April 29, 1956 – June 28, 1963)
 Prefects Apostolic of Hollandia (Roman Rite)
 Fr. Oscar Cremers, O.F.M. (June 3, 1949 – 1954)

References
 GCatholic.org
 Catholic Hierarchy

Roman Catholic dioceses in Indonesia
Roman Catholic Diocese of Jayapura
Roman Catholic Diocese of Jayapura
Roman Catholic dioceses and prelatures established in the 20th century
Christian organizations established in 1949